Pinandagatan Falls is located in a far-flung barangay of New Tubigon, Sibagat, Agusan del Sur in the southern Philippine island of Mindanao. It is one of the tourist attractions of Sibagat, Agusan del Sur.

Etymology

Pinandagatan from the word "dagatan" is a Visayan language term meaning "lake", the falls is hidden in the middle of the forest and believed to be the longest running waterfalls in Caraga Region.

Geography

Pinandagatan Falls is located in the hinterland forest in Barangay New Tubigon, Sibagat, Agusan del Sur.

The falls is untouched, a hidden paradise, with so many tiers to immerse deep into the forest. Going to is not easy with a 31-kilometer bumpy ride of muddy trek of uneven surface. It is now a popular hiking trail.

See also
 Sibagat, Agusan del Sur
 Agusan del Sur
 Caraga Region

References

Waterfalls of the Philippines
Landforms of Agusan del Sur
Agusan del Sur